The Singapore Slingers are an eighteen-member orchestra based in Dallas, Texas that specializes in performing pre-swing American dance music, with a particular focus on popular songs of the 1920s and early 1930s. They have been called the "coolest, quirkiest, retro jazz group" in Dallas by the local press. They are the only group of their kind in Dallas, with a repertoire that regularly features fox trots, waltzes, marches, one-steps, two-steps, rags, tangos, and rumbas. The band was formed in late 2007 by Dallas native Matt Tolentino, and continues under his direction, normally consisting of four reeds, three brass, five rhythm players, and a string section including three violins, a viola, a cello, and a string bass. The Singapore Slingers were nominated in the category "Best Jazz Act" for the 2011 Dallas Observer Music Awards, and were named Best Pre-Swing Jazz Orchestra by the Dallas Observer in 2011.

The Singapore Slingers perform regularly at venues all over Dallas. Bandleader Tolentino plays many instruments, including clarinet, tuba, bass saxophone, ukulele, banjo, piano, and accordion. Much of the band’s repertoire utilizes orchestrations of Tin Pan Alley tunes popularized by the likes of the Mills Brothers, Duke Ellington, the Club Royal Orchestra, Paul Whiteman, the Original Dixieland Jazz Band, Marx Brothers films, and other sources, and stays true to vintage arrangements from America's finest composers of the first three decades of the twentieth century.

Discography 
When Summer Is Gone (CD) (2010)
Midnight, The Stars, And You (CD) (Matt Tolentino solo project) (2011)
The Frank Skinner Project (CD) (2014)
 Light My Way To Love (CD) (2020)

References

External links
The Singapore Slingers
The Singapore Slingers on MySpace

Musical groups from Dallas
Musical groups established in 2007
American jazz ensembles from Texas
Jazz musicians from Texas